Tillandsia purpurea is a species in the genus Tillandsia. It is endemic to Peru, first described by Ruiz & Pavón in 1802.

Cultivars
 Tillandsia 'Shooting Star'

References

purpurea
Endemic flora of Peru
Plants described in 1802